Hampshire High School is a public school in Romney, West Virginia that serves grades 9 through 12 and is a part of Hampshire County Schools under the auspices of the Hampshire County Board of Education. It is the only high school in Hampshire County. Hampshire High School is located on Trojan Way (West Virginia Secondary Route 50/47) off of the Northwestern Turnpike (U.S. Route 50) near Romney. The school currently has approximately 800 students enrolled, with that number continuing to grow as Hampshire County is listed among the fastest growing school systems in the state. It also employs approximately 70 faculty members. Hampshire High School's current principal is Adam Feazel.

Background 
HHS is a product of a consolidation of Capon Bridge High School and Romney High School in the Fall of 1964. The site selected for the high school's campus was a knoll on South Branch Mountain along the Northwestern Turnpike (U.S. Route 50) east of Romney. Originally serving 10th through 12th grades, Hampshire High School underwent an expansion in 1998 and began serving 9th graders in the Fall of 1999.

Mascot and colors 
Hampshire High School's colors are green and white with the occasional addition of black and/or gold. Its mascot is the Trojan.

Sports 
Hampshire High School currently has the following athletic programs: football, soccer, tennis, cross country, track and field, volleyball, basketball, baseball, softball, wrestling, cheerleading, swimming, and tennis.

Its athletic complex consists of the Paul Clovis Trail (cross country), Rannells Field (football), a football practice field, Soldier Field (soccer field), discus field, baseball field, softball field, basketball/volleyball court, tennis court, and the uncompleted Sports Complex.

Notable alumni
Jerry Mezzatesta, long-serving West Virginia House of Delegates member for the 50th District, former teacher at Hampshire High School
Sam Pancake, actor, mother Robin Pancake is a former art teacher at Hampshire High School

See also
Hampshire County Schools
List of high schools in West Virginia
Education in West Virginia

References

External links
Hampshire High School

1964 establishments in West Virginia
Educational institutions established in 1964
Public high schools in West Virginia
Buildings and structures in Romney, West Virginia
Schools in Hampshire County, West Virginia